Return of a Stranger is a 1937 British drama film directed by Victor Hanbury and starring Griffith Jones, Rosalyn Boulter, Ellis Jeffries and Athole Stewart. The film was made at Shepperton Studios as a Quota quickie, and was distributed by RKO Pictures to meet the company's annual requirement under the Quota.

Synopsis
James Martin plans to elope with Carol Wall, the daughter of the wealthy chairman of Wall Chemicals. While in Southampton with her, Martin is wrongly accused of murdering a man and is forced to flee to South Africa. Carol meanwhile marries a wealthy City of London financier. Martin rebuilds his life in South Africa and finishes developing a valuable new chemical formula which he had begun in England. After he is partially disfigured by an explosion in his laboratory, Martin decides to return home to clear his name, confident that he will no longer be recognised. However, Carol's husband quickly begins to suspect that the visiting South African is really Martin and alerts Scotland Yard.

Cast
 Griffith Jones as James Martin
 Rosalyn Boulter as Carol Wall
 Ellis Jeffries as Lady Wall
 Athole Stewart as Sir Patrick Wall
 Cecil Ramage as John Forbes
 Constance Godridge as Esme
 Sylvia Marriott as Mary
 James Harcourt as Johnson
 Harold Scott as Peters
 Howard Douglas as Van Der Geun 
 David Farrar as Doctor Young
 Peter Gawthorne as Sir Herbert Tompkin
 Edie Martin as Mrs Stevens

References

Bibliography
 Chibnall, Steve. Quota Quickies: The Birth of the British 'B' film. British Film Institute, 2007.
 Low, Rachael. History of the British Film: Filmmaking in 1930s Britain. George Allen & Unwin, 1985 .

External links
 

1937 films
1937 drama films
British drama films
Films shot at Shepperton Studios
Films directed by Victor Hanbury
Films set in London
Films set in Hampshire
Films set in South Africa
Films scored by Jack Beaver
British black-and-white films
1930s English-language films
1930s British films